Fort Bay is the official and only port on the island of Saba and sits on the south side of the island, about  by road from The Bottom. The port is very important for the island as most of its supplies arrive here by boat. The port currently has two piers.

Structure
Before the construction of the first pier at Fort Bay in 1972, Ladder Bay (and its 800 perilous steps hand-cut out of the cliffside) was the only way to get any goods or people on or off the island.  Since then, Fort Bay harbor has grown to two piers, the larger dedicated to cargo and dive boats, while the second smaller pier is mostly used by local fishermen. The port is also home to the Saba Sea Rescue Organization that have a rescue ship stationed just outside the mouth to the port. The ship is equipped with decompression tanks, rescue equipment and personnel. On land, there are also two decompression tanks that are used in diving emergency situations.  During 2010–2011, various improvements were made to the Fort Bay harbor, including the quay wall, boat ramp, and retaining wall.

The port also contains two bars and one restaurant which are frequently visited by locals and tourists. Additionally the only gas station on the island is situated here.

Fort Bay has been affected by several hurricanes over the years, including breakwaters damage in Hurricane Lenny in 1999, one of the piers being destroyed by Hurricane Omar in 2008, and the fisherman's pier being damaged by Hurricane Irma and later destroyed by Hurricane Maria in 2017.

Transport
Fort Bay has two ferry services operating between Saba and Sint Maarten.  The ferries that operate these routes are The Edge (based on Sint Maarten) and Dawn 2 (based on Saba), with almost daily trips.

References

External links

Official Website of Fort Bay Harbor

Geography of Saba (island)
Buildings and structures in The Bottom